Oona Laurence (born August 1, 2002) is an American actress. She is best known for the role of Matilda Wormwood in Matilda on Broadway alongside Bailey Ryon, Milly Shapiro, and Sophia Gennusa. She began her career as a New York City-based child actress, with credits in film, theatre, and television.

Career
After several appearances in regional theatre productions and minor roles in short films and television episodes, Laurence auditioned for the new musical Matilda on Broadway in 2012. Laurence landed the role of Matilda, performing in the show from March 4 to December 15, 2013. She performed alongside Bailey Ryon, Milly Shapiro, and Sophia Gennusa.

After Matilda, Laurence transitioned to film acting, appearing in Tumorhead, A Little Game, The Grief of Others, I Smile Back, Damsel, Lamb, and Southpaw, portraying the daughter of Jake Gyllenhaal and Rachel McAdams' characters.

She has appeared on television in Law & Order: Special Victims Unit and Orange Is the New Black.

In 2016, she co-starred as Natalie in the film Pete's Dragon, and portrayed Jane Mitchell, the daughter of Mila Kunis' character Amy Mitchell, in Bad Moms.

In 2017, Laurence co-starred opposite Colin Farrell, Nicole Kidman, Kirsten Dunst, and Elle Fanning in Sofia Coppola's The Beguiled.

She is the voice of Hedgehog and additional characters in the Cartoon Network series Summer Camp Island. She also performs the theme song.

In 2020, she starred in the Netflix American family horror film A Babysitter's Guide to Monster Hunting alongside Tom Felton, Indya Moore, and Tamara Smart.

Personal life
Laurence lives in New York City and has two sisters, Aimée and Jeté, who are also actresses.

Filmography

Film

Television

Theatre

Awards and nominations

References

External links
 

2002 births
Living people
21st-century American actresses
American musical theatre actresses
American film actresses
American television actresses
Actresses from New York City
Tony Award winners
American child actresses